The  men's 110 metres hurdles at the 2009 World Championships in Athletics was held at the Olympic Stadium 19 and 20 August.

Just as he had done at the 2008 Olympic final, former world record holder Liu Xiang missed the competition through injury, leaving the reigning Olympic champion and world record holder Dayron Robles as the favourite. Furthermore, two of the fastest hurdlers of the season, David Oliver and Dexter Faulk, had not been selected for the American team, which featured David Payne, Terrence Trammell, and Aries Merritt as the main challengers to Robles. Twenty-one-year-old Ryan Brathwaite was a much improved hurdler that season, and Dwight Thomas and Maurice Wignall of Jamaica were other contenders.

The heats stage was one of the more eventful of the championships: Robles struggled to qualify in third as he was hampered by an injury, Merritt did not progress from his race (having earlier suffered a twisted ankle), and Andy Turner (another carrying an injury) was also eliminated. Dániel Kiss was the fastest of the round, setting a Hungarian record. Brathwaite was the only pre-race favourite to win in the heats, while Alexander John and Ji Wei were the other fastest hurdlers. In the semi finals, Trammell and Petr Svoboda were the top two in the first semi-final, and Payne and Brathwaite (who set a national record), took the second race. William Sharman set a personal best to win the third semi-final, which saw Robles pull up due to injury and Kiss eliminated.

In the final, Brathwaite started poorly but was soon level with Payne and Trammell. The three remained even after the final hurdle and, with one hundredth of a second between them, it was a photo finish. Brathwaite emerged as the winner with a national record of 13.14 seconds, Trammell was the silver medallist, and Payne took the bronze. Sharman took fourth with a personal best of 13.30 seconds and Wignall finished fifth, clocking 13.31 seconds, his best of the year.

Although he had entered the competition as an outside medal possibility, Brathwaite became the youngest ever champion in the event, and was also Barbados' first ever gold medallist in athletics at either the World Championships or the Olympic Games. Unable to capitalise on the absence of Xiang and Robles, perennial minor medallists Payne and Trammell again missed out on the gold medal. After Brathwaite, fourth-placed William Sharman was the other surprise of the race: he was a last minute addition to the British team, and his two personal best performances turned him from a rank outsider to Europe's fastest at the competition.

Medalists

Records

Qualification standards

Schedule

Results

Heats
Qualification: First 3 in each heat (Q) and the next 6 fastest (q) advance to the semi-finals.

Key:  Q = qualification by place in heat, q = qualification by overall place, SB = Seasonal best

Semi-finals
Qualification: First 2 in each semi-final (Q) and the next 2 fastest (q) advance to the final.

Final

References
General
110 metres hurdles results. IAAF. Retrieved on 2009-08-25.
Specific

110 metres hurdles
Sprint hurdles at the World Athletics Championships